Robert Kretschmer (1812–1872) was a German illustrator, known for his illustrations in Brehms Tierleben.

References

Further reading
 Andreas Daum, Wissenschaftspopularisierung im 19. Jahrhundert: Bürgerliche Kultur, naturwissenschaftliche Bildung und die deutsche Öffentlichkeit, 1848–1914. Munich: Oldenbourg, 1998, 
 Luca Zordan: Zwischen Mythos und Wissenschaft. Ökologisierung in der Zusammenarbeit von Künstlern und Wissenschaftlern im 19. Jahrhundert: Kretschmers und Brehms Illustrirtes Thierleben. Bielefeld: transcript Verlag, 2019,

Links 

German illustrators
1812 births
1872 deaths
People from Świdnica
People from the Province of Silesia